The men's 500 meter at the 2021 KNSB Dutch Single Distance Championships took place in Heerenveen at the Thialf ice skating rink on Friday 30 October 2020. Although the tournament was held in 2020 it was part of the 2020–2021 speed skating season. There were 18 participants.

Statistics

Result

Draw 1st. 500 meter

Draw 2nd. 500 meter

Source:

References

Single Distance Championships
2021 Single Distance